City Hall is the new headquarters of the Sunderland City Council. It is located on the Vaux Site, adjacent to Keel Square, and was completed in November 2021.

History
The new building was commissioned to replace the old Sunderland Civic Centre which had been the home of the council since 1970. The council estimated that it would cost £5 million to refurbish the old civic centre and therefore decided to procure a new structure instead.

Construction of the new building started in November 2019. It is being designed by FaulknerBrowns and is being built by Bowmer + Kirkland at a cost of £42 million. The development is being financed by Legal & General as part of a larger programme of investment in the city totalling £100 million. The design involves two office blocks, one of five-storeys and the other of six-storeys, connected by a glass atrium, facing onto St Mary's Way. The total area created by the new glass and steel structure will be . The contractual arrangements envisage some area being made available to accommodate the housing provider, Gentoo, and the Department for Work and Pensions as well as Sunderland City Council.

Progress was delayed by two months because of the COVID-19 pandemic but recommenced in May 2020. However, the topping out of the building was completed by civic leaders in August 2020, and it opened to the public on 29 November 2021.

References

City and town halls in Tyne and Wear
Buildings and structures in the City of Sunderland
City of Sunderland
Office buildings completed in 2021
2021 establishments in England